Suculentophichthus nasus also known as the Red Sea flappy snake eel is a species of ophichthid fish found in Israel. This species occurs Eilat in Gulf of Aqaba, Red Sea, Israel. This species is the only known member of its genus.

References

Ophichthidae
Fish described in 2015